A zoom climb is a climb where the rate of climb is greater than the maximum climb rate using only the thrust of the aircraft's engines.  The additional climb rate is attained by reduction of horizontal speed.  Before a zoom climb, the aircraft accelerates to a high air speed at an altitude at which it can operate in sustained level flight. The pilot then pulls steeply upward, trading the kinetic energy of forward motion for altitude (potential energy). This is different from a steady climb, where the increase in potential energy comes from mechanical work done by the engines.

Zoom climbs are somewhat commonly performed by modern fighter aircraft. Typically referred to as an "unrestricted climb", pilots will take off and accelerate to a high speed near the ground and then pull the aircraft vertically or nearly vertical to quickly climb to the aircraft's cruising altitude.

In a demonstration of their performance, an English Electric Lightning fighter aircraft used a zoom climb to intercept a Lockheed U-2 cruising at 66,000 ft, above the Lightning's service ceiling of 60,000 feet. Shortly before this, it had even reached 88,000 ft.

Performance history 
Zoom climbs have been used to test new aircraft designs and conduct research in different flight regimes.

An NF-104A Starfighter fitted with an additional rocket engine was regularly used in zoom-climb research for future spaceflight.  On 7 May 1958, the aircraft reached an altitude of 27,812 m (91,249 feet) in a zoom climb at Edwards Air Force Base, setting a new altitude record.  The Mach 2 mission took the airplane so high that the standard F-104's engine routinely exceeded its temperature limit and had to be shut down. Sometimes the engine simply flamed out for lack of air. Then the pilot steered the aircraft like a returning spaceship to a lower altitude, where he would restart the engine.

On 4 September 1959, a record of 28,852 m (94,658 ft) was set by a specially modified Sukhoi Su-9 (designated T-431), using zoom climb.

On 6 December 1959, during the proving phase of the McDonnell Douglas F-4 Phantom II, an early version of the aircraft (the XF4H-1) performed a zoom climb to 30,040 m (98,557 ft) as part of Operation "Top Flight". Commander Lawrence E. Flint Jr. accelerated his aircraft to Mach 2.5 at 14,330 m (47,000 ft) and climbed to 27,430 m (90,000 ft) at a 45-degree angle. He then shut down the engines and glided to the peak altitude. As the aircraft fell through 21,300 m (70,000 ft), Flint restarted the engines and resumed normal flight. 

On 10 December 1963, flight test pilot Chuck Yeager was nearly killed flying a heavily modified F-104. 

On 25 July 1973, Aleksandr Fedotov reached 35,230 m (115,600 feet) in a Mikoyan-Gurevich MiG-25M with 1,000 kg payload, and 36,240 m (118,900 feet) with no load (an absolute world record). In the thin air, the engines flamed out and the aircraft coasted in a ballistic trajectory by inertia alone. At the apex the indicated airspeed (IAS) had dropped to 75 km/h. On 3 August 1977 Fedotov broke his own record by reaching 123,520 ft (37,650 m) which is the record for highest manned jet aircraft and highest self-launched planes as of 2023.

Without engine power, the cockpit would depressurize on these missions. Above 43,000 feet, the standard oxygen system cannot provide blood oxygen saturation enough for the pilot to function, so a full-body pressure suit had to be used.

See also 

 Flight altitude record

References 

Aerial maneuvers
Aviation records